Said Adrus is an Ugandan-British artist born in 1958 in Uganda. 

During the 1980s, his imagery has been described as computer paintings on canvas. He later turned to mixed media and multi-media ways of working, experimenting with the moving image and screen projection. Since 2015, he's been combining his digital media work with various materials that allude to his voyage from African and Asian coastlines to the Western hemisphere, describing migration and emigration in the modern setting.

He references Andy Warhol as an influence to his collage work, comparing Warhol's parodying of Western art conventions to his pushing of the boundaries of painting while keeping its elements.

Adrus lives and practices in the UK, Switzerland, and other countries in Europe.

Biography 
Adrus was born to Gujarati Muslim parents in 1958 in Kampala, Uganda, in what was at the time known as ‘British East Africa’.  His family moved there being part of the British colonial project of moving South Asian people to East Africa to build railways. They then moved to Switzerland, where they still live. Adrus then moved to Britain, due to Idi Amin expelling the descendents of Gujarati indentured labourers, many of whom moved to the UK.

Adrus has a BA(Hons) in Fine Art awarded by the Nottingham Trent Polytechnic. 

He is a polyglot, speaking German, French, Hindi, Gujarati and English.

Works

Group exhibitions 
 1985: Eastern Views: Works by Young Asian Artists from the Midlands
 1985: Three Asian Artists
 1988: Black Art: Plotting the Course
 1988: Paintings by Said Adrus - Ceramics by Louise Block, Horizon Gallery, London.
 1990: In Focus
 1990: In Sight, in View
 1990: "Let the Canvas Come to Life with Dark Faces”
 1991: History and Identity: Seven Painters
 1992: Black People and the British Flag
 1992: Crossing Black Waters
 1993: Transition of Riches
2008: Next We Change Earth
2011: Recreating the Archive

Reviews, articles, and texts 

 1990: ‘It Ain’t Ethnic’, Black Arts in London, no. 128, (1 - 30 September), 5.

Talks and events 

 2016: Straight Outta Gyri

References 

1958 births
Living people
People from Kampala
Ugandan artists
Alumni of Nottingham Trent University